Ioannis Constantinidis (Greek: Ιωάννης Κωνσταντινίδης), also known by the pen name Kostas Giannidis (21 August 1903 – 17 January 1984) was a Greek composer, pianist and conductor.

Constantinidis was born in Smyrna (today Izmir) in 1903. He came to Greece after the destruction of Smyrna and continued his studies in Berlin (1923–1931). He returned to Athens and worked as a conductor and composer at the musical theater composing many operettas, musical comedies, and revues. He would sign and publish his popular works as Kostas Giannidis, and his classical compositions as his birth name.

He died in Athens in 1984.

Works
Constantinidis wrote symphonic, chamber music, music for films, compositions for piano, artsongs, and many popular songs.

Film music
He composed music for seven Greek movies, including:
Οι Γερμανοί Ξανάρχονται (The Germans Strike Again)
Ο μεθύστακας (The Drunkard)

References

1903 births
1984 deaths
Greek classical composers
Greek film score composers
Male film score composers
Greek conductors (music)
Greek pianists
Greek opera composers
Smyrniote Greeks
20th-century conductors (music)
20th-century pianists
20th-century composers
Male pianists
20th-century male musicians
Emigrants from the Ottoman Empire to Greece
Musicians from İzmir